The Wagon Master is a 1929 American Western sound film starring Ken Maynard, directed by Harry Joe Brown, and written by Marion Jackson and Leslie Mason. The film was edited by Fred Allen and the cinematographer was Ted D. McCord. Maynard's character in the film was referred to as "the Rambler." There is a whip fight in this kinetic film. Maynard is believed to have been the first onscreen "Singing Cowboy" in this movie, succeeded by John Wayne as "Singin' Sandy" Saunders in Riders of Destiny (1933) and Gene Autry after Wayne eventually declined to flourish a dubbed singing voice in future endeavors; Autry "auditioned" for the mantle in the 1934 film In Old Santa Fe starring Ken Maynard.

Cast

 Ken Maynard as The Rambler
 Edith Roberts as Sue Smith
 Tom Santschi as Jake Lynch
 Jack Hanlon as Billie Hollister
 Al Ferguson as Jacques Frazelle
 Bobby Dunn as Buckeye Pete
 Frank Rice as Grasshoper Jim

External links
 

1929 films
1929 Western (genre) films
American Western (genre) films
American black-and-white films
Transitional sound Western (genre) films
Universal Pictures films
1920s American films